Robert Dean was a professional baseball infielder in the Negro leagues. He played with the Lincoln Giants in 1925 and the Homestead Grays in 1929.

References

External links
 and Seamheads

Lincoln Giants players
Homestead Grays players
Year of birth missing
Year of death missing
Baseball infielders